Syracuse Orange women's ice hockey is a college ice hockey program that has represented Syracuse University in National Collegiate Athletic Association (NCAA) Division I and College Hockey America (CHA) since the 2008–09 season. Syracuse plays its home games at Tennity Ice Skating Pavilion in Syracuse, New York.

History

2008–09 season 
On March 6, 2008, it was announced that the Orange would join College Hockey America. Syracuse was the fifth school to join the conference for women's hockey.

Paul Flanagan, who coached the St. Lawrence Skating Saints women's ice hockey program to five NCAA Frozen Four appearances was appointed as the first coach for the Orange women's ice hockey program. Flanagan had been the 2001 ECAC and American Hockey Coaches Association Coach of the Year. For the inaugural season, Flanagan was joined by Graham Thomas, who played for Mannheim Jung Adler in Germany, and Erin O'Brien, a two-time All-American at Plattsburgh State, an NCAA Division III school for women's ice hockey.

Some of the first players for the team were transfer players from other schools. Gabrielle Beaudry, transferred to the Orange from Boston  College. Cheyenne Bojeski was a transfer from Mercyhurst, while Julie Rising came to the Orange from Bemidji State. Lucy Schoedel and Stefany Marty were both transfers from New Hampshire.

The Orange's inaugural season was in 2008–09, and the team played its first ever game on Wednesday, October 1, 2008 at Colgate. During the first game Lucy Schoedel recorded 34 saves and Megan Skelly scored the first goal in Syracuse women's ice hockey history nine seconds into the game. Despite holding a 2–0 lead in the game, the Orange lost to Colgate by a score of 3–4. The following two games were against the eventual NCAA champion Wisconsin Badgers on October 2 and 3. Despite losing both games, Lucy Schoedel made seventy five saves in two games. A week later, Syracuse played in its first ever College Hockey America conference game. The Orange took on the Robert Morris Colonials. Lucy Schoedel recorded her 100th career save (and totaling 130 stops in just four games) in a 1–0 losing effort. Team captain Stefanie Marty scored her first goal for Syracuse on October 17. It was a 4–2 loss at Quinnipiac. Of note, Cheyenne Bojeski also scored her first ever goal for Syracuse. The following day, co-captains Julie Rising and Stefanie Marty would both score as Syraucse won its first ever game by a 2–0 tally.

March 5, 2009 was the first postseason game in Orange history. In the quarterfinal round of the College Hockey America tournament, the Orange were ousted by the Niagara Purple Eagles by a score of 3–2. Freshman forward Kylie Klassen made history by scoring the first playoff goal in the program's history.
 Assists went to Megan Skelly and Julie Rising.

2009–10 season 
After a slow start to the season, the Orange won their first game of the season on October, 2009 in a 3–1 win over the Providence Friars. The win would be the first of a four-game win streak after starting the season winless in the first six games. The start of the 2009–10 season was highlighted by eight straight road games to start the season, after a home exhibition game against the University of Guelph. By December 2009, the team was ranked in the ranked tenth in the USA Today/USA Hockey Magazine poll. The ranking marked the first time the Orange was nationally ranked in the program's history.

On March 5, 2010, the Orange won the first playoff game in program history. Sophomore Lisa Mullan scored two goals, as the Orange defeated Niagara by a score of 5–3. In addition, freshman Isabel Menard added three points. The Orange advanced to the CHA Championship against rival Mercyhurst but fell 1–3.

2010–11 season 
On October 1, 2010, by tying Northeastern in the season opener, it marked the first time that the Orange started the season unbeaten. Stefanie Marty had two goals in the game. Northeastern featured her twin sister Julia Marty. It was the first time the sisters had ever played against each other in their NCAA careers. With a 4–2 defeat of New Hampshire on October 8, 2010, the Orange is off to its best start in program history (1–0–1). In the win, senior transfer Ashley Cockell scored her first career goal for the Orange. Freshman goaltender Kallie Billadeau made 26 saves as she played in her first game for the Orange.

The Orange continued their best start in program history with a 2–2–1 record. The Orange registered a 7–1 win against Connecticut on the 16th of October. Syracuse's seven goals against Connecticut ties for second all-time in Orange history. Twelve different players registered points. Isabel Menard recorded the first hat trick in school history and added an assist. In addition, freshman Sadie St. Germain scored her first career goal and had two assists in the win. The Orange outshot the Huskies 38–19. In faceoffs, they had a 38–17 advantage over them. On November 30, Kallie Billadeau set a Syracuse record with 57 saves in a 4–1 loss against No. 1 Cornell. By December 6, 2010, Isabel Menard had nine multiple-point scoring games, setting a Syracuse program record.  The team ended the season

2018-2019
Syracuse won its first CHA Tournament championship in 2019, defeating Robert Morris by a score of 6-2.  Orange forward Lindsay Eastwood scored three goals in the tournament, tying the league record. It was Syracuse's 7th appearance in the championship game. En route, they defeated Lindenwood in the quarterfinals and Mercyhurst in the semi-finals.  As CHA champions, the Orange earned an automatic berth in the NCAA tournament, their first appearance ever.  They played Wisconsin in the first round, losing 4-0. Allie Munroe won the CHA Defenseman of the Year award, and forward Lauren Bellefontaine won CSA Rookie of the Year.

Coaches
Head coach Paul Flanagan, who started the program at SU, retired at the end of 2021-22 season after 14 seasons. At Syracuse, he was a four-time CHA Coach of the Year compiled a 204-225-49 record.

In May 2022, former Clarkson University Assistant Coach Britni Smith was named the 2nd head coach in program history.

Year by year statistics 
{| class="wikitable"
|bgcolor="#ffeeaa"|Won Championship
|bgcolor="#ddffdd"|<small>Lost Championship</small>
|bgcolor="#d0e7ff"|Conference Champions
|bgcolor="#ffbbbb"|League Leader
|}

Current roster
As of August 30, 2022.

 Exhibition games 
On November 28 and 29, 2008, Syracuse travelled to Ottawa, Ontario to participate in two exhibition games with two Canadian universities. The Orange defeated Carleton University by a score of 3–1 on the 28th but felt to the University of Ottawa in a 4–3 overtime loss.
The Orange played the McGill Martlets women's ice hockey team in Montreal, Quebec. McGill was ranked number one in Canada, but Syracuse provided a valiant effort. The Martlets outshot the Orange by a tiny margin of 30–28 and won the game by a score of 4–2. Julie Rising and Megan Skelly each had two points for the Orange.

Olympians

International

Awards and honors
Gabrielle Beaudry, CHA Defensive Player of the Week (February 15, 2010)
 Erin Burns, CHA Rookie of the Week (November 30, 2009)
 Holly Carrie-Mattimoe, CHA Rookie of the Week (Week of January 11, 2010)
Abbey Miller, 2016 CHA Goaltending champion
 Jenn Gilligan, Syracuse, CHA Goaltender of the Month (March 2015) 
Stephanie Grossi – Syracuse, 2014–15 CHA Rookie of the Year
 Stefanie Marty, CHA Offensive Player of the Week, (Week of October 12, 2009)
 Stefany Marty, CHA Offensive Player of the Week, (Week of December 13, 2009)
 Isabel Menard, CHA Rookie of the Week, (Week of October 12, 2009)
 Isabel Menard, CHA Rookie of the Week, (Week of October 19, 2009)
 Isabel Menard, CHA Rookie of the Week, (Week of November 23, 2009)
 Isabel Menard, CHA Rookie of the Week, (Week of December 7, 2009)
 Isabel Menard, CHA Rookie of the Week  (Week of February 8, 2010)
 Isabel Menard, 2011 Patty Kazmaier Award Nominee
 Julie Rising, CHA Player of the Week, (Week of February 1)
 Lucy Schoedel, CHA Defensive Player of the Week, (Week of November 23)
 Lucy Schoedel, CHA Defensive Player of the Week, (Week of December 13)
 Lucy Schoedel, Nominee for Patty Kazmaier Memorial Award

CHA Major Awards
Paul Flanagan, 2015 CHA Coach of the Year
Paul Flanagan, 2013 CHA Coach of the Year
Paul Flanagan, 2010 CHA Coach of the Year
 Isabel Menard, CHA 2010 Rookie of the Year'''
 Allie Munroe, 2019 CHA Best Defenseman 
Lauren Bellefontaine, 2019 CHA Rookie of the Year
Jessica DiGirolamo, 2020-21 CHA Defensive Player of the Year Award
Abby Moloughney, 2020-21 CHA Best Defensive Forward

Pre-Season All-CHA Team
G – Lucy Schoedel, 2009 selection

All-CHA First Team
Isabel Menard, First Team All-CHA 2010
Isabel Menard, 2011 All-CHA First Team
Melissa Piacentini: Syracuse, 2014–15 All-CHA First Team 
Nicole Renault: Syracuse, 2014–15 All-CHA First Team
Stephanie Grossi, Syracuse, 2015-2016, All CHA First Team
Allie Munroe, 2018-19 All CHA First Team

All-CHA Second Team
Stefanie Marty, Second Team All-CHA 2010
Brittaney Maschmeyer, Second Team All-CHA 2010
Gabrielle Beaudry, Second Team All-CHA 2010
Lucy Schoedel, Second Team All-CHA 2010
Jennifer Gilligan: Syracuse, 2014–15 All-CHA Second Team 
Akane Hosoyamada: Syracuse, 2014–15 All-CHA Second Team
Emma Polask, 2018-19 All-CHA Second Team

CHA All-Rookie Team
Holly Carrie-Mattimoe, 2010 selection
Isabel Menard, 2010 selection
Kallie Billadeau, 2011 CHA All-Rookie team
Akane Hosoyamada, 2011 CHA All-Rookie team
Alsyha Burriss: Syracuse, 2014–15 CHA All- Rookie Team 
Stephanie Grossi: Syracuse, 2014–15 CHA All- Rookie Team

CHA All-Tournament Team
Lisa Mullan, 2010 tournament
Gabrielle Beaudry, 2010 tournament
Lucy Schoedel, 2010 tournament

Orange in professional hockey

See also
 List of college women's ice hockey coaches with 250 wins (Paul Flanagan ranks seventh on all-time list)

References

External links

 
Ice hockey clubs established in 2008
Ice hockey teams in New York (state)
2008 establishments in New York (state)